Admiralty Sound is a sound which extends in a NE-SW direction and separates Seymour and Snow Hill Islands from James Ross Island, off the NE end of Antarctic Peninsula. The broad NE part of the sound was named Admiralty Inlet by the British expedition under Capt. Ross, who discovered it on Jan. 6, 1843. The feature was determined to be a sound rather than a bay in 1902 by the Swedish Antarctic Expedition under Otto Nordenskiöld.

References

Sounds of Graham Land
Landforms of the James Ross Island group